Edward E'Dainia King (born December 3, 1969) is a former American football guard in the National Football League. He played for the Cleveland Browns and the New Orleans Saints.
Bypassed final year of eligibility at Auburn.

He has been named a Columbus Lions assistant coach in 2009.

References

External links 
NFL.com player page

1969 births
Living people
All-American college football players
American football offensive guards
Auburn Tigers football players
Barcelona Dragons players
Cleveland Browns players
New Orleans Saints players
Players of American football from Columbus, Georgia
Birmingham Thunderbolts players